Wnuk ("grandson" in Polish) is a Polish surname. Notable people with the surname include:

 Edmund Wnuk-Lipiński (1944–2015), Polish sociologist and writer
 Lawrence Wnuk (1908–2006), Polish Catholic priest
 Marian Wnuk (1906–1967), Polish sculptor
 Oliver Wnuk (born 1976), German actor
 Rafał Wnuk (born 1967), Polish historian
 Witold Wnuk (born 1957), Polish musician

See also
 

Polish-language surnames